Pompeji was a  cargo ship which was built in 1939 by Flensburger Schiffbau-Gesellschaft, Flensburg, Germany. She was seized as a war prize in 1945 and renamed Empire Blackwater. Ownership passed to the British Ministry of War Transport (MoWT) and then the United States Maritime Commission (USMC). In 1949 she was sold to a Danish company and renamed Krusaa. She was sold in 1960 to a Finnish company and renamed Krucia and later Helvi. In 1969 she was sold to a Panamanian company and renamed Eastern Faith. She was scrapped in 1975.

Description
The ship was a  cargo ship. She was built by Flensburger Schiffbau Geschellshaft, Flensburg, as yard number 450. The ship was launched as Pompeji on 11 October 1939 and completed in February 1940.

Career

Pompeji
Pompeji was built for Deutsche Levante Linie AG, Hamburg, which was her port of registry. In 1942, she was sold to Bick, Godeffroy & Co, Hamburg. Pompeji was seized as a war prize in Kiel in 1945.

Empire Blackwater
Ownership passed to the MoWT and the ship was renamed Empire Blackwater. Her port of registry was changed to London. Empire Blackwater was operated under the management of P Carrick & Co Ltd. The MoWT ceased to exist during 1945, becoming the Ministry of Transport. In March 1946, Empire Blackwater was awarded to the United States as a war prize, with an estimated value of $288,000. She transferred to the USMC and her port of registry changed to New York. On 21 October 1946, Empire Blackwater was laid up in the Hudson River. On 25 March 1947, she was sold to Seatrade Corporation for $216,000.

Krusaa
In 1949, Empire Blackwater was sold to Dampskibs Hetland AS, Denmark and renamed Krusaa. Her port of registry was changed to Copenhagen. Krusaa was operated under the management of Basse & Co, Copenhagen. In 1957, Krusaa was sold to Dampskibs Pacific AS.

Krucia
In 1960, Krusaa was sold to AB Krucia O/Y, Finland and renamed Krucia. Her port of registry was changed to Vaasa. She was operated under the management of Nils Berg. In 1967, Krucia was sold to AB Vasa Shipping O/Y.

Helvi
In 1969, Krusaa was sold to Rederi AB Nidarholm Laivanvarustamo and renamed Helvi. Her port of registry was changed to Turku. Helvi was operated under the management of H Hayrynen O/Y.

Eastern Faith
In 1969, Helvi was sold to the South East Navigation Corporation, Panama and renamed Eastern Faith. Her port of registry was Panama City. She was operated by the Nan Sing Navigation Co, Taiwan. Eastern Faith was scrapped in August 1975 by the Chi Shun Hwa Steel Co Ltd, Kaohsiung, Taiwan. She arrived for scrapping on 30 July 1975.

Official numbers and code letters

Official numbers were a forerunner to IMO numbers. Empire Blackwater had the UK Official Number 180776. Krucia had the Finnish Official Number 206 and Helvi had the Finnish Official Number 1462. Krucia, Helvi and Eastern Faith had the IMO number 5197121.

Pompeji used the code letters DKCM. Empire Blackwater used the code letters GZRM.

Propulsion
This drove a low-pressure steam turbine. This drove the propeller through hydraulic couplings.

References

External links
Wartime career of Pompeji (in German)

1939 ships
Ships built in Flensburg
Steamships of Germany
Merchant ships of Germany
World War II merchant ships of Germany
Empire ships
Ministry of War Transport ships
Steamships of the United Kingdom
Merchant ships of the United Kingdom
Steamships of Denmark
Merchant ships of Denmark
Steamships of Finland
Merchant ships of Finland
Steamships of Panama
Merchant ships of Panama